Ketron Island is an island and a census-designated place (CDP) in Pierce County, Washington, United States. The island had a population of 24 persons according to the 2000 census, and 17 persons at the 2010 census.

Ketron Island is located in southern Puget Sound just off the shoreline from Steilacoom. It lies between the mainland near the city of Steilacoom and Anderson Island near the extreme south end of Puget Sound.

History
The British explorer and navigator George Vancouver camped on Ketron Island in May of 1792.

The island was originally named "Kittson Island" by Charles Wilkes during the Wilkes Expedition of 1838–1842, but was misspelled "Ketron" by his cartographers.  The island was named for William Kittson, an employee of the Hudson's Bay Company, who supervised the construction of Fort Nisqually in 1833 and served as its chief factor.

The entire island was bought by an entrepreneur in 1946 with plans to build 200 homes, but this attempt was abandoned due to the cost of a sewer system.

On August 10, 2018, an empty Horizon Air Q400 was stolen from Seattle–Tacoma International Airport and crashed on the southern tip of Ketron Island, killing the sole occupant, Richard Russell.

Transportation

Ketron is accessible only by ferry. The Steilacoom/Anderson Island/Ketron Island run is the only one operated by Pierce County.  The ferry service to Ketron is available four times per day. The ferry runs between 5:45 AM to 8:00 PM Monday through Sunday.

The ferry Steilacoom II was put into service in January 2007 to work side by side with the aging ferry Christine Anderson. The Steilacoom II still serves with the Christine Anderson to transport islanders from both Ketron and Anderson Island.

Education
The island is served by the Steilacoom Historical School District. Steilacoom High School is the district's comprehensive high school.

References

External links

Census-designated places in Pierce County, Washington
Census-designated places in Washington (state)